Enten is a Sumerian fertility deity. He was said to have been created by Enlil as a guardian of farmers, along with the vegetation god Emesh. Enten was given specific responsibility for the fertility of ewes, goats, cows, donkeys, birds, and other animals. He is identified with the abundance of the earth and with the winter period.

References 

 

Mesopotamian gods
Fertility gods
Earth gods
Animal gods
Agricultural gods